Chris Eubank Jr. vs Liam Smith, billed as Unleashed, was a professional boxing match contested between former IBO super-middleweight and WBA interim middleweight champion, Chris Eubank Jr., and former WBO light-middleweight, Liam Smith.

The bout took place in the Manchester Arena. Smith won the bout via fourth round TKO.

Background

Fight card
Reference:

References

2023 in boxing
2023 in British sport
2023 sports events in Manchester
Boxing in Manchester
Boxing matches
January 2023 sports events in the United Kingdom